Linn's Stamp News is an American weekly magazine for stamp collectors. It is published by Amos Media Co., which also publishes the Scott Standard Postage Stamp Catalogue, the Scott Specialized Catalogue of United States Stamps and Covers, and the Scott Classic Specialized Catalogue of Stamps and Covers 1840–1940. Linn's was founded in 1928 by George W. Linn as Linn's Weekly Stamp News.

The size of the paper shrank in late 2007.

Description
The front page of the publication features news from the stamp world, including significant new stamp issues around the world, major auctions of rare items, significant new discoveries, philatelic controversies, and notable events, such as eBay's ending two programs that regularly examined stamp and coin listings for the purpose of deterring fraudulent sales.

Each issue has additional news stories inside along with a wide variety of features and columns.

Regular features include:
 "U.S. Stamp News" by John Hotchner, a weekly column that touches on a variety of unusual and interesting U.S. stamps and covers, along with a monthly column on stamp expertizing and a monthly cartoon contest.
 "Editor's Insights" by Charles Snee, editor of Linn's and the Scott catalogs. Snee discusses numerous topics and current news of interest to collectors.
 "Washington Postal Scene" by veteran reporter Bill McAllister, whose in-depth stories on news involving the United States Postal Service have gained national attention.
 "Kitchen Table Philately" by two pseudonymous mixture reviewers, "E. Rawolik VI" and "E Rawolik VII" ("kiloware" spelled backward). Both reviewers report on the contents of stamp mixtures (also known as kiloware) bought from dealers advertising in Linn's. They use the number of stamps in the mixture and pricing to determine whether a particular mixture is a good value or is overpriced.
 "Collector's Forum" is about unusual stamps or usages reported by collectors. When the Linn's staff can answer the inquiry, they provide details. In other cases, the answer is provided by readers in a subsequent "Forum Update."
 "Stamp Market Tips" gives readers tips on stamps that the columnists consider to be of good value.
 The "Stamp Events Calendar" and "Auction Calendar" indicate forthcoming events.
 The United States Stamp Program is a weekly feature. Stamp programs of Canada and the United Nations are published monthly.

Linn's Stamp News Monthly
Collectors who subscribe to the weekly publication also receive Linn's Stamp News Monthly. 
Linn's Stamp News Monthly includes a special section devoted to new listings in the Scott catalog. The monthly publication also features:
 "Auction Roundup" by Linn's New York Correspondent Matthew Healey, which offers coverage of recent auctions and the prices realized at those sales.
 "Spotlight" by noted stamp writer Ken Lawrence, who presents in-depth research on a variety of stamp topics.
 "Amazing Stamp Stories" by David Lodge and Patrick Reynolds, a cartoon-style feature on rare and interesting stamps.

Collectors also can subscribe to Linn's Stamp News Monthly only, at a reduced price. Subscribers can read the complete contents online at no extra charge. Several eNewsletters are sent each week that contain excerpts to Linn’s stories with links to the full story online.

See also
 George Ward Linn

References

External links
 

Weekly magazines published in the United States
English-language magazines
Magazines established in 1928
Magazines published in Ohio
Philatelic periodicals
Hobby magazines published in the United States